Brigadier Alexander Alfred Hayton  was a South African officer.  During World War I he served as a lieutenant in the East African Campaign and in Egypt. He was the commanding officer of the 4th South African Brigade in the Western Desert Campaign in North Africa during World War II. In civilian life he worked as Chief Traffic Officer in Johannesburg.

Awards and decorations

References

External links 
 Hayton A.A., Brigadier
 Military Career of AA Hayton

South African Army generals
British emigrants to South Africa
White South African people
South African military personnel of World War I
South African military personnel of World War II
Companions of the Distinguished Service Order
1894 births
1977 deaths